Pratima Puhan (born 27 August 1991 in Cuttack, Odisha) is an Indian rower. She won a bronze medal in Women coxless pair event with Pramila Prava Minz of Odisha in the 2010 Asian Games.

Achievements
Wrote rowing history for India by becoming the first woman of the country along with Pramila Prava Minz to win a medal in 2010 Asian Games.
She and Pramila Prava Minz claimed a bronze in the coxless pair event, clocking seven minutes and 47.50 seconds at Guangzhou, China on 19 November 2010.

References

1991 births
Living people
Sportswomen from Odisha
Indian female rowers
People from Cuttack
Asian Games medalists in rowing
Rowers at the 2010 Asian Games
Asian Games bronze medalists for India
21st-century Indian women
21st-century Indian people
Medalists at the 2010 Asian Games